Alto is a town in Cherokee County, Texas, United States. With a population of 1,027 at the 2020 U.S. census, Alto is the closest municipality to the Caddo Mounds State Historic Site, an archaeological site dating back to 800 CE, featuring a prehistoric village and ceremonial center.

History
An early settler in the region was Martin Lacy, who built Lacy's Fort just to the west to the current site of Alto in around 1838. In 1838 and 1839, during the campaign to suppress the Córdova Rebellion, the fort served as an operations and supply base for the Third Militia brigade commanded by Maj. Gen. Thomas J. Rusk.

The town of Alto was laid out in 1849 and named for the Spanish word meaning "high," on account of the site's elevation on a drainage divide between the Neches and Angelina Rivers.

Geography

Alto is located at  (31.650131, –95.073810).
Alto had a prisoner of war camp during World War II, which served the Cherokee County area.

The climate in this area is characterized by hot, humid summers and generally mild to cool winters.  According to the Köppen Climate Classification system, Alto has a humid subtropical climate, abbreviated "Cfa" on climate maps.

Demographics

As of the 2020 United States census, there were 1,027 people, 459 households, and 283 families residing in the town.

According to the 2000 U.S. census, there were 1,190 people, 452 households, and 282 families residing in the town. The population density was 707.1 people per square mile (273.5/km2). There were 534 housing units at an average density of 317.3 per square mile (122.7/km2). The racial makeup of the town was 65.55% White, 24.79% African American, 0.50% Native American, 0.17% Asian, 6.81% from other races, and 2.18% from two or more races. Hispanic or Latino of any race were 10.25% of the population.

Education
Public schools are managed by the Alto Independent School District. These are Alto High School, Alto Middle School, 
and Alto Elementary School.

Public safety
In 2011, the city eliminated its entire police force after the city council cut the police budget to zero, causing residents to brace for increased crime. A councilman is quoted as saying "The police department, being a non-money-making entity, was the easiest to get rid of." Meanwhile, police services are provided by the county sheriff and, assuming the town's finances improve, it will be opened up again in December.

Notable people
James Z. Spearing, member of the United States House of Representatives from Louisiana's 2nd congressional district from 1924 to 1931, was born in Alto in 1864.

References

Towns in Cherokee County, Texas
Towns in Texas